The 2007–08 Coppa Italia was the 61st edition of the tournament.  Fixtures were announced at 16:00 CET, July 25, 2007.  The tournament began on August 14, 2007, and ended on May 24, 2008 with a single-match final to be played at the Stadio Olimpico in Rome. For the fourth consecutive season, Roma and Internazionale were the finalists.  Roma won the tournament by a score of 2–1 in the final.

The format of the 2007–08 Coppa, which was announced on June 28, 2007, is a major departure from the format used in previous years.  The new format reduces the number of competitors to the 42 teams which will play in Serie A and Serie B for the 2007–08 season; no Serie C teams participated in the tournament.  Also, the rather unusual two-leg final was eliminated.

Seedings and format
The format for pairings will be as follows:
 First phase: one-leg fixtures
 First round: The bottom 24 seeds (19–42) are paired
 Second round: The 12 first round winners are paired
 Second phase: one-leg fixtures
 6 first phase winners and seeds 9–18 are paired
 Third phase: two-leg fixtures
 Round of 16: 8 second phase winners are inserted into a bracket with seeds 1–8
 Quarterfinals and Semifinals: Two-leg fixtures with pairings based upon bracket
 Final: one-leg fixture at neutral venue

Seeds in the tournament will be allocated as follows:

Fixtures

Opening rounds

 indicates home team in each leg

Top left bracket

Bottom left bracket

Top right bracket

Bottom Right Bracket

1 The match was played in Pistoia, approximately 67 km from Pisa.  Pisa was originally designated as the home team.

2 The match was played behind closed doors in Avellino.

3 The match was played in Fiorenzuola, approximately 23 km from Piacenza.  Piacenza was originally designated as the home team.

4 The match was played at Ravenna, even though according to the original bracket Piacenza was designated as the home team.

Semi-finals and final

Final

Top goalscorers

References

Coppa Italia seasons
Italy
Coppa Italia